SEMATECH (from Semiconductor Manufacturing Technology) is a not-for-profit consortium that performs research and development to advance chip manufacturing. SEMATECH has broad engagement with various sectors of the R&D community, including chipmakers, equipment and material suppliers, universities, research institutes, and government partners.  The group is funded by member dues.

History
SEMATECH was conceived in 1986, formed in 1987, and began operating in Austin, Texas in 1988 as a partnership between the United States government and 14 U.S.-based semiconductor manufacturers to solve common manufacturing problems and regain competitiveness for the U.S. semiconductor industry that had been surpassed by Japanese industry in the mid-1980s. SEMATECH was funded over five years by public subsidies coming from the U.S. Department of Defense via the Defense Advanced Research Projects Agency (DARPA) for a total of $500 million.

Following a determination by SEMATECH Board of Directors to eliminate matching funds from the U.S. government after 1996, the organization's focus shifted from the U.S. semiconductor industry to the larger international semiconductor industry, abandoning the initial U.S. government-initiative. Its members represent about half of the worldwide chip market.  In late 2015, SEMATECH transferred the Critical Materials Council (CMC), a membership group of semiconductor fabricators, to TECHCET CA LLC, an advisory service firm dedicated to providing supply-chain and market information on electronic materials. This group of procurement and quality managers continues to focus on anticipating and remedying materials supply-chain issues and focusing on best practices.  The CMC is now an integral part of TECHCET's business and provides guidance on their work of Critical Materials Reports and CMC Conference activities.

Technology focus
SEMATECH conducts research on the technical challenges and costs associated with developing new materials, processes, and equipment for semiconductor manufacturing. Advanced technology programs focus on EUV lithography including photomask blank and photoresist development, materials and emerging technologies for device structures, metrology, manufacturing, and environment and safety issues.

College of Nanoscale Science and Engineering (CNSE)
In January 2003 SEMATECH and the University at Albany – State University of New York – established a major partnership to commercialize advanced semiconductor, nanotechnology and other emerging technologies.

Through its government-university-industry partnership with the State of New York and the College of Nanoscale Science and Engineering (CNSE) of the University at Albany, SEMATECH is conducting programs in lithography and metrology at CNSE’s Albany NanoTech Complex.

In 2010, SEMATECH expanded its cooperation with CNSE with the announcement that the ISMI would relocate its headquarters and operations to CNSE's Albany NanoTech Complex beginning in January 2011.

With over $6.5 billion in high-tech investments, CNSE's  Albany NanoTech Complex features the only fully integrated, 300 mm wafer, computer chip pilot prototyping and demonstration line within  of Class 1 capable cleanrooms.

Location
SEMATECH has access to laboratories and development fabs in Albany, New York.  Its headquarters are at CNSE in Albany.

Industry participation
SEMATECH hosts a variety of worldwide conferences, symposiums, and workshops (e.g., Litho Forum, Manufacturing Week) and delivers papers, presentations, and joint reports at major industry conferences (SPIE, IEDM, SEMICON West).

References

External links
SEMATECH homepage

Organizations established in 1987
Non-profit organizations based in New York (state)
Technology consortia
Information technology organizations based in North America
Cleanroom technology